Julie Aileen Kelly (1 November 1913 – 22 October 1991), known professionally as Judy Kelly, was an Australian-born British actress. She arrived in Britain in 1932 after winning a competition organised by the Australian British Empire Films, which included 3 months tuition at the British International Studios at Elstree. She appeared in a number of films for British International Pictures during the 1930s. She was sometimes cast as a love interest for the comedian Leslie Fuller, and also appeared alongside the musical stars Gene Gerrard and Stanley Lupino.

She appeared in the 1941 stage musical Lady Behave. Other wartime stage roles include Vernon Sylvaine's Women Aren't Angels and Warn That Man.

Her final film was a supporting role in the comedy Warning to Wantons in 1949.

Partial filmography

 Adam's Apple (1928) - Vamp
 Money Talks (1932) - His Daughter Rosie
 The Private Life of Henry VIII (1933) - Lady Rochford (uncredited)
 Crime on the Hill (1933) - Alice Green
 Mannequin (1933) - Heather Trent
 The Love Nest (1933) - Girl
 Their Night Out (1933) - Betty Oliphant
 L'argent par les fenêtres (1933)
 Hawley's of High Street (1933) - Millie Hawley
 The Black Abbot (1934) - Sylvia Hillcrist
 The Rise of Catherine the Great (1934) - Guest at Hunting Lodge (uncredited)
 The Four Masked Men (1934) - Patricia Brent
 Tiger Bay (1934) - Bar Girl
 The Luck of a Sailor (1934) - Lillie (uncredited)
 Anything Might Happen (1934) - Kit Dundas
 Royal Cavalcade (1935) - Girl
 Drake the Pirate (1935) - Donavera (uncredited)
 Captain Bill (1935) - Polly
 Things Are Looking Up (1935) - Opal
 Marry the Girl (1935) - Jane Elliott
 It's a Bet (1935) - Anne
 Charing Cross Road (1935) - Vera
 Under Proof (1936) - Corone
 The First Offence (1936) - Girl in Garage
 A Star Fell from Heaven (1936) - Flora
 The Limping Man (1936) - Olga Hoyt
 Aren't Men Beasts! (1937) - Yvette Bingham
 The Price of Folly (1937) - Frances
 Make-Up (1937) - Marien Hutton
 Over She Goes (1937) - Alice Mayhill
 The Last Chance (1937) - Mary Perrin
 Boys Will Be Girls (1937) - Thelma
 Jane Steps Out (1938) - Margot Kent
 Queer Cargo (1938) - Ann Warren
 Luck of the Navy (1938) - Cynthia Maybridge
 Premiere (1938) - Carmen Daviot
 At the Villa Rose (1940) - Celia Harland
 The Midas Touch (1940) - Lydia Brenton
 Dead Man's Shoes (1940) - Michelle Allain
 George and Margaret (1940) - Frankie
 Tomorrow We Live (1943) - Germaine Bertan
 Saloon Bar (1940) - Girl (uncredited)
 The Butler's Dilemma (1943) - Ann Carrington
 It Happened One Sunday (1944) - Violet
 Dead of Night (1945) - Joyce Grainger (segment "Linking Story") / (segment "The Hearse Driver")
 Dancing with Crime (1947) - Toni Masters
 Warning to Wantons (1949) - Mimi de Vaillant

References

External links

1913 births
1991 deaths
British film actresses
Australian emigrants to the United Kingdom
20th-century British actresses
Actresses from Sydney